Arthur Tarilton (21 August 1878 – 1921) was a Jamaican cricketer. He played in one first-class match for the Jamaican cricket team in 1904/05.

See also
 List of Jamaican representative cricketers

References

External links
 

1878 births
1921 deaths
Jamaican cricketers
Jamaica cricketers
People from Saint Philip, Barbados
Emigrants from Barbados to Jamaica